Dom Roberto is a 1962 Portuguese film directed by Ernesto de Sousa and starring Raul Solnado, Glicínia Quartin and Nicolau Breyner. It was released on 30 May 1962.

Cast
Raul Solnado
Glicínia Quartin
Nicolau Breyner
Rui Mendes
Luís Cerqueira

References

External links

Portuguese comedy-drama films
1960s Portuguese-language films